The purpose of the Monash University Faculty of Arts is 'the pursuit, advancement and application of knowledge in the humanities, social and environmental sciences and creative and performing arts'. It offers degrees from undergraduate to PhD level. Entrance into the undergraduate Bachelor of Arts program is competitive, as it is the most popular Arts degree among university applicants in Victoria.

History 
The Faculty of Arts was one of the foundation faculties of Monash University. In 1961, the faculty enrolled about 150 students out of a University total of about 360.  Today, student enrolments number approximately 7,500.

Initially, the Faculty consisted only of the Departments of English, History, Philosophy and Modern Languages (Politics was part of the Economics Faculty). During the 1960s and 70s, this expanded to include a range of new disciplines. Some of these, such as sociology and Indonesian, had never previously been taught in Australia. The Faculty's research and teaching became well known due to its depth in studies relating to Asia, which was unusual at the time for an Australian university.

With the University's expansion in the 1990s, the Faculty developed a research and teaching presence overseas, in Malaysia, South Africa, and Italy.

Location
The home campus for the Faculty of Arts is Monash University Clayton Campus. However, the Faculty has a teaching and research presence at most of Monash's campuses, including Caulfield, Malaysia, South Africa, and Berwick.

Notable alumni
The Monash Faculty of Arts has produced a number of notable graduates who are currently leaders in their fields, including:

Government, Politics and Law
Bill Shorten - Federal Opposition Leader, Victorian President of the ALP, former National Secretary of the AWU, 
Daniel Andrews - Victorian Premier, Victorian Labor Leader
Kevin Bell - Justice of the Supreme Court of Victoria, current President of the Victorian Civil and Administrative Tribunal (VCAT)
Jennifer Coate - Current Coroner of Victoria; first President of the Children's Court of Victoria
Peter Costello - Longest-serving Treasurer of Australia
Paul Grant - President of the Children's Court of Victoria
Ian Gray - Chief Magistrate of the Magistrates' Court of Victoria
Felicity Hampel - Prominent human rights lawyer, now Judge of the County Court of Victoria
Alistair Harkness - Politician
Gavin Jennings - Former Victorian Minister for Environment and Climate Change
Simon Molesworth AM QC - Chairman, Australian Council of National Trusts
Brendan O'Connor - Australian Minister for Employment Participation
Clare O'Neil - Youngest female Mayor in Australian history
Robert Ray - Australian Senator and Former Defence Minister
Tony Robinson - Minister for Consumer Affairs
Michael Rozenes - Chief Judge of the County Court of Victoria
Sharman Stone- Former Australian Minister for Workforce Participation
Don Watson - author, chief speechwriter to Prime Minister Paul Keating
Beth Wilson - Victorian Health Services Commissioner

Media and Arts
Cecilia Dart-Thornton - Author
Lindy Davies - Actor and Dean of the Victorian College of Arts
Laurie Duggan - Poet
Jon Faine - Melbourne radio presenter
Max Gillies AM - Actor/satirist
Andy Griffiths - children's author
Leslie Howard - Pianist and composer
Michael Leunig - Cartoonist
Eva Orner - Academy-Award winning film producer
John A. Scott - poet
Jo Stanley - radio personality
Alan Wearne - Poet

Academia
Diane Bell - Anthropologist
Michael Clyne - Linguist
Ben Kiernan - Leading researcher in the study of genocide, Yale University
Stuart Macintyre - Historian

Business
Fiona Balfour - Businesswoman, former Qantas and Telstra executive
Tony D'Aloisio - Chairman, Australian Securities and Investments Commission (ASIC)
Peter Ivany - Australian media mogul and billionaire
Naomi Milgrom - Owner and CEO of Sussan Group

Schools
The Faculty has six academic schools in Australia, and two overseas, which are responsible for the creation and dissemination of disciplinary knowledge through individual and group research and through the development of undergraduate and postgraduate teaching programs.

Schools in Australia
 Geography and Environmental Science
 Media, Film and Journalism
 Languages, Literatures, Cultures and Linguistics
 Philosophical, Historical and International Studies
 Social Sciences
 Sir Zelman Cowen School of Music and Performance

Schools in Malaysia
 School of Arts and Social Sciences

Schools in South Africa
 School of Social Science

References

External links
 Faculty of Arts website

Arts